Jhilmil Residential Area is a residential housing project developed in Keraniganj Upazila by Rajdhani Unnayan Kartripakkha (Capital Development Authority) as a suburb of Dhaka.

History
The project was founded in 1997, adjacent to Dhaka-Mawa Highway in Keraniganj. It has a total of 1,635 plots for housing and Rajdhani Unnayan Kartripakkha plans to build 12 thousand apartments. The proposed Mass Rapid Transit will have a station for line 1 in the project. The project has been included in a future ring road around Dhaka. The project is comparatively smaller than other housing projects of Rajuk.

References

Keraniganj Upazila
Neighbourhoods in Dhaka